Enterprise is an unincorporated community in Hocking County, in the U.S. state of Ohio.

History
Enterprise contained a post office between 1870 and 1966. In 1883, Enterprise was one of two post offices within Falls Township.

References

Unincorporated communities in Hocking County, Ohio
Unincorporated communities in Ohio